Perpetua Sappa Konman (born 29 September 1972) is a Micronesian physician and politician. In 2021 she became the first woman elected to Congress.

Biography
Born in 1972 and from Fefan island in Chuuk State, Konman became a physician. She married Derensio S. Konman, a politician and member of Congress, and had six children.

Following her husband's death in 2021, she contested the subsequent special election for Chuuk Election District 3 (a Senate seat). Receiving 2,532 votes, she defeated Myron I. Hashiguchi (1,962 votes) and Inson I. Namper (1,292) votes, becoming the first woman elected to Congress. She was sworn into office on 13 December.

References

1972 births
Living people
People from Chuuk State
Federated States of Micronesia physicians
Federated States of Micronesia women in politics 
Members of the Congress of the Federated States of Micronesia
21st-century women physicians
21st-century women politicians